Parque Necaxa was a multi-use stadium in Mexico City, Mexico. It was initially used as the stadium of Club Necaxa matches.  It was replaced by Estadio Azul in 1950.  The capacity of the stadium was 22,000 spectators.

See also

References

1930 establishments in Mexico
1955 disestablishments in Mexico
Defunct football venues in Mexico
Sports venues in Mexico City
Sports venues completed in 1930